U.S. Route 24 (US 24) in Indiana runs east from the Illinois state line to Huntington. At Huntington, US 24 turns northeast and runs to Fort Wayne; it then runs concurrently with Interstate 69 (I-69) and I-469 to bypass the city before entering Ohio at the state line east of Fort Wayne. The segment of US 24 between Logansport and Toledo, Ohio is part of the Hoosier Heartland Industrial Corridor project of the Intermodal Surface Transportation Efficiency Act.

Route description

Illinois to Logansport 
This western section of US 24 is mostly rural two-lane. US 24 enters Indiana from Illinois concurrent with U.S. Route 52 (US 52). US 24 and US 52 head east towards Kentland, passing through an intersection with State Road 71. In Kentland, US 24 and US 52 have an intersection with U.S. Route 41 where US 52 turns south. US 24 heads east from Kentland towards Remington, passing through a concurrency with State Road 55. In Remington US 24 starts a concurrency with U.S. Route 231. US 24 and US 231 head east towards Wolcott, passing through an interchange with Interstate 65. In Wolcott US 231 heads south and US 24 heads east towards Reynolds. In Reynolds US 24 has an intersection with State Road 43 and starts a concurrency with U.S. Route 421 (US 421). US 24 and US 421 heads east towards Monticello. In Monticello, US 421 heads south with State Road 39 (SR 39), US 24 now has a concurrency with SR 39. US 24 and SR 39 head east from Monticello. east of Monticello SR 39 heads north, while US 24 heads east towards Logansport, passing through Idaville, Burnettsville, and Lake Cicott.

Logansport to Fort Wayne 
This section is a four-lane rural divided highway. US 24 and U.S. Route 35 (US 35) have a concurrency around Logansport and have an interchange with State Road 25 (SR 25) and an intersection with State Road 29 (SR 29). East of Logansport, US 35 heads southeast towards Kokomo. US 24 heads east towards Peru passing through an interchange with U.S. Route 31 (US 31). On the north side of Peru US 24 has an intersection with State Road 19. From Peru US 24 heads east towards Wabash passing through an intersection with State Road 115. In Wabash US 24 has intersections with State Road 15 and State Road 13. US 24 then heads towards Huntington passing through an intersection with State Road 524 and a short concurrency with State Road 105. On the west side of Huntington US 24 begins a concurrency with State Road 9 (SR 9). US 24 and SR 9 pass through an intersection with U.S. Route 224 (US 224)/State Road 5. North of Huntington, SR 9 heads north and US 24 heads northeast towards Fort Wayne. On the way to Fort Wayne US 24 passes through an intersection with State Road 114. Then, on the west side of Fort Wayne, US 24 enters onto northbound Interstate 69.

Fort Wayne to Ohio 

This section of US 24 is mostly freeway, and includes overlaps with two Interstate Highways. US 24 merges onto I-69 heading north at that route's exit 302. US 24 (along with US 30) then leaves I-69 at exit 315 to head east then south along I-469. US 24 runs concurrently with I-469 until the east side of New Haven, passing through interchanges with Maplecrest Read and SR 37 along its path. US 24 leaves I-469 at exit 21 in New Haven, a conventional parclo interchange, but from there heads northeast toward Ohio as a four-lane mostly Interstate standard rural freeway. After leaving I-469, the US 24 freeway has a substandard (short, low-speed Y-ramps of a RIRO design) interchange with Bruick Road and Old US 24 in rural Allen County. Continuing past a standard diamond interchange at Webster Road, there follows a subsequent interchange with SR 101 in Woodburn. Beyond the SR 101 junction, US 24 enters Ohio, where the freeway ends but the route continues on in the Buckeye State as a four-lane divided rural arterial highway (though full access-control extends past the state line about another 2 miles).

History

Logansport to Fort Wayne 
The original route of US 24 went through the city of Logansport, then was a two-lane undivided rural highway north of the present four-lane highway from Logansport to a point near New Waverly. From there, the original facility ran south of today's four-lane roadway, through Peru and roughly paralleling the old Wabash Railroad (now Norfolk Southern) mainline tracks into the city of Wabash. Between that city and the Wabash County town of Largo, the old road still is south of the present alignment, but from there to the west side of Huntington (at SR 9) the present four-lane facility replaced the original two-lane road. US 24 originally went through the city of Huntington, but now is bypassed to the west and north by the modern alignment. From east of Huntington to Fort Wayne the four-lane roadway was built over the two-lane highway, then known as Upper Huntington Road.

Fort Wayne to New Haven 
Before US 24 was rerouted onto I-69 and I-469, US 24 passed through both Fort Wayne and its eastern suburb, New Haven. It entered the metropolitan area concurrent with SR 37 on Upper Huntington Road (now Jefferson Boulevard), and picked up another concurrency with former SR 14 at Illinois Road on the west side of the city. This was also the point where Upper Huntington Road transitioned to being Jefferson Boulevard. US 24 and the state roads crossed the Saint Marys River in Swinney Park then became split through downtown Fort Wayne on a one-way pair of streets, with Jefferson Boulevard and then Maumee Avenue carrying eastbound traffic and Washington Boulevard handling westbound travel. East of downtown, SR 37 left the one-way pair of Maumee and Washington at Anthony Boulevard, departing to the north. The one-way pair merged onto Washington Blvd just east of Memorial Park, near Edsall Avenue on the east side.

Just east of Fort Wayne US 24 had an interchange with the Bueter Road alignment of the original 1953 US 30 "Bypass" (later renamed Coliseum Boulevard). From that tight cloverleaf interchange to the east, US 24 & SR 14 were concurrent with US 30 (now SR 930) and they then bridged the Nickel Plate Railroad (now Norfolk Southern) mainline before merging onto New Haven Avenue, heading due east toward that suburb. Then US 24 and SR 14 headed into downtown New Haven, with US 30 splitting off to the south to bypass central New Haven. Just beyond that split, US 24 turned north onto Broadway Street, with SR 14 continuing due east along Dawkins Road to Ohio. On Broadway, US 24 crossed the Nickel Plate railroad mainline at-grade, and then curved slightly north-northwest through downtown New Haven before turning east onto Rose Avenue which led out of town (and past the point which later would become the I-469 interchange) as the old alignment which was later replaced by the modern freeway.

In the early 1980s, US 24 was rerouted out of downtown Fort Wayne, following I-69 north to US 30/Coliseum Boulevard (now SR 930), and then following Coliseum Boulevard around the northern and eastern sides of the city to the cloverleaf at Washington Boulevard. When the southeastern portions of I-469 opened to traffic in 1989, US 24 was rerouted again, this time onto I-69 south, then I-469 at I-69's (then Exit 96, now 296) to the current interchange with US 24 east of New Haven. This resulted in a "doubling back" to the south-southwest from the Jefferson Boulevard interchange (then 101, now 301) along I-69 to reach I-469's south junction with I-69. Many savvy through travelers on US 24 simply left that route in Huntington County and turned east onto County Road 900 North at Roanoke, which becomes Lafayette Center Road at the Allen County line), and which about  after leaving US 24 deposited them directly onto eastbound I-469 and (at the time) US 24 at the I-69 interchange. Though this deviation was along a two-lane road it saved them several miles of unnecessary out-of-the-way travel along the officially shielded route.

After the original two-lane alignment east of New Haven along the Maumee River was bypassed by the present four-lane freeway in 2012, US 24 was again officially rerouted to its present posted alignment, using the northern loop of I-469, via I-69 north. However, many through travelers still use the Co Rd 900 S/Lafayette Center Road (both now widened and improved) to I-469 east and north route as it remains far shorter and more direct than the officially designated US 24 northern bypass of the Summit City and its eastern suburb.

Fort to Port

2008–2012 upgrades 

In November 2007, Indiana announced it would reduce costs by changing its segment to be an expressway with at-grade intersections at Bruick Road, Webster Road, and SR 101, instead of a freeway section with interchanges and overpasses. The only overpasses would be two narrow overpasses for non-motorized traffic (Amish buggies) to cross US 24. Also, the interchange of I-469 and US 24 would remain as is with traffic signals at the US 24 ramp terminals. The cost savings without interchanges would be approximately $75–$80 million. Right of way would be purchased for future interchanges. This change has been unpopular due to safety concerns with the heavy truck traffic on the corridor. INDOT claimed that the current traffic on US 24 does not justify interchanges, even though the 2005 Final EIS states that it does.

Responding to widespread public outcry over the scaled-back design, Governor Mitch Daniels announced on December 12, 2007, that US 24 would be built as a freeway initially from Bruick Road to the Ohio state line, with interchanges at SR 101 and Webster Road. The intersection with Bruick Road was to have initially been an at-grade crossing, but INDOT announced in August 2009 that a grade-separated interchange was to be built here as well. Indiana's entire  segment of US 24 was completed as a freeway. The interchange with I-469, however, was unchanged and not free-flowing in all traffic movements.

Upon completion, ownership of the existing US 24 was transferred to Allen County and became a frontage road east of Bruick Road, providing access to the B.F. Goodrich tire plant and adjacent homes and farmland. Indiana financed construction through the Major Moves program, and will be reimbursed when federal highway funds become available. Sections of the two-lane road that have been bypassed by the freeway are now locally signed as "Old US 24."

Governor Daniels and INDOT held the groundbreaking ceremony for the Indiana section on April 30, 2008. On October 29, 2009, Governor Daniels and Ohio Governor Ted Strickland held a ribbon-cutting ceremony at the Indiana–Ohio state line opening the new US 24 highway from SR 101 near Woodburn, Indiana to Ohio State Route 424 near Defiance, Ohio. The project was designated completed and the final segment opened on November 4, 2012.

Interchange with I-469 
In the original plans, INDOT intended to upgrade the I-469/US 24 interchange to allow free-flowing movements between the two highways as documented in the Fort-to-Port Final Environmental Impact Statement published in 2005. This included building a  flyover ramp from eastbound US 24 to southbound I-469. Five years later, no work had been performed on this interchange.

In May 2017, INDOT announced that a modification to the original plan was in process. The long proposed flyover was being replaced with two significantly shorter bridges. Furthermore, the interchange was going to be upgraded in two phases. The initial phase will eliminate the traffic signal and would entail everything but the modified flyover, in particular both northbound I-469 to eastbound US 24 and westbound US 24 to northbound I-469 would be converted to free-flowing movements. This first phase was scheduled to be completed in 2019, with the remaining free-flowing connection to be completed in late 2020.

Major intersections

See also

References

External links 

 Indiana
Transportation in Allen County, Indiana
Transportation in Cass County, Indiana
Transportation in Fort Wayne, Indiana
Transportation in Huntington County, Indiana
Transportation in Jasper County, Indiana
Transportation in Miami County, Indiana
Transportation in Newton County, Indiana
Transportation in Wabash County, Indiana
Transportation in White County, Indiana
24